Yatesville Lake State Park in Kentucky is a recreational facility in the eastern part of the commonwealth, close to the town of Louisa, Kentucky in Lawrence County. The park features an 18-hole golf course, boating, fishing and swimming, campsites, and hiking trails.

References

External links

Yatesville Lake State Park Kentucky Department of Parks
Yatesville Lake State Park Map Kentucky Department of Parks

Protected areas of Lawrence County, Kentucky
State parks of Kentucky
United States Army Corps of Engineers, Huntington District
Protected areas established in 1999
1999 establishments in Kentucky